A Tree Full of Stars is a 1965 novel by American author Davis Grubb.

Story line and development
The novel, set in the Great Depression, is the story of the Dance family who keep their Christmas lights on all year round.  "It was based on a family, again from Moundsville [West Virginia—Grubb's hometown] who kept their Christmas tree lit all year.  Strangely, this enraged some people in the town.  The family was finally forced to leave.

Editions

 Charles Scribner's Sons, 1965. This was Grubb's fourth and final novel for Scribner's.  His next novel,
Shadow of My Brother would be published by Holt, Rinehart & Winston in 1966

 An abridged version appeared in Ladies Home Journal in December 1965.

References

1965 American novels
Novels by Davis Grubb
Christmas novels
Great Depression novels
Charles Scribner's Sons books